The1956–57 Israel State Cup (Gvia HaMedina) was the 19th season of Israel's nationwide football cup competition and the fourth after the Israeli Declaration of Independence.

Although the competition began on 11 February 1956, it was delayed severely by the Suez Crisis, and later rounds were not played until April 1957, with the final being held on 6 July at 1957 at the Haifa Municipal Stadium in Haifa. Hapoel Petah Tikva met Maccabi Jaffa in the final and won the cup after securing a 2–1 win.

Results

First round
74 of the 75 Liga Gimel clubs participated in this round. Most of the matches were drawn as divisional matches, with the exception of two matches.

Second round

 SK Nes Tziona and Hapoel Safed received a bye to the third round.

Third round

Fourth round

Intermediate Round

Fifth round

 Maccabi Jaffa, Maccabi Petah Tikva received a bye to the sixth round, as their opponents, Ahva Notzrit Haifa and Hapoel Kochav HaTzafon Jerusalem, folded.

Sixth round

Quarter-finals

Semi-finals

Replay

Final

Notes

References
100 Years of Football 1906-2006, Elisha Shohat (Israel), 2006

External links
 Israel Football Association website

Israel State Cup
State Cup
State Cup
Israel State Cup seasons